Laurel Anne Chartow (born June 3, 1985), known professionally as Laurel Halo, is an American electronic musician currently based in Los Angeles, California. She released her debut album Quarantine on Hyperdub in 2012 to critical acclaim; it was named album of the year by The Wire. She followed with studio albums Chance of Rain (2013) and Dust (2017), mini-album Raw Silk Uncut Wood (2018) and the original soundtrack release of Possessed (2020).

Biography
Laurel Anne Chartow was born on June 3, 1985, in Ann Arbor, Michigan, where she also grew up and learned to play the piano, guitar and violin. She draws influences from the music of Detroit, London and Berlin, as well as from her time in free jazz ensembles and as a college radio DJ. She moved to New York City in 2009, to Berlin in 2013, and to Los Angeles in 2023.

Musical career
Halo's debut album, Quarantine, was released on the London-based label Hyperdub in June 2012. The album was named Album of the Year in 2012 by The Wire. Halo also released the Behind The Green Door EP, as well her second album, Chance of Rain, on Hyperdub in 2013.

In 2015, Halo released In Situ, a double-EP for the London-based label Honest Jon's.  Also that year she worked alongside Rashad Becker, Julia Holter and NH'Koxyen on the collaborative, 'telepathic' Terepa EP, in addition to recording a cover of a previously lost Karen Dalton song for the Tompkins Square compilation, Remembering Mountains. 2015 also saw Halo collaborate with John Cale and Lisa Gerrard for a performance of Cale's music at the Arts Centre Melbourne.

In 2016, Laurel Halo composed the soundtrack for Still Be Here, a collaborative piece featuring the Japanese virtual pop star Hatsune Miku jointly commissioned by CTM/Transmediale. It premiered at HKW in Berlin, Germany.

In June 2017, Halo released her third album Dust on Hyperdub, featuring contributions from Eli Keszler, Julia Holter, Michael Salu, Max D, Klein, and Lafawndah among others. The album received critical praise from numerous publications.

In January 2018, it was announced that Halo wrote a score for the documentary film Possessed by Dutch design studio Metahaven and Rob Schröder. Later that year in July, she released a mini-album on Parisian label Latency Recordings entitled Raw Silk Uncut Wood, which she stated was inspired by her contribution to the film. The mini-album consists of six instrumental ambient tracks, and features contributions from cellist Oliver Coates, whom she also worked with on the Possessed score, and percussionist Eli Keszler. Halo also teamed up with Bristol-based musician Hodge on the collaborative EP Tru / Opal / The Light Within You, which was released on November 30, 2018, by Livity Sound Recordings.

In February 2019, Halo provided the soundtrack for Eckhaus Latta's Fall 2019 runway at New York Fashion Week. March 2019 Halo released the 68th edition of the DJ-Kicks mix series on !K7, followed by an extensive world DJ tour. In fall 2019 Halo curated the programming for London multidisciplinary event series MODE, featuring artists such as Julia Holter, Kali Malone, GAS and Éliane Radigue.

In April 2020, Halo's original score for Possessed was released by The Vinyl Factory. In October 2020, Halo walked for Chloé's Spring 2021 runway show at Paris Fashion Week.

January 2021 saw her announce the label Awe as an outlet for her solo and collaborative work. Since January 2021 Halo has held a monthly NTS residency under the same name, featuring guests such as Kode9, Mica Levi, TTB and Aya. In August 2021, the Moritz von Oswald Trio released a new album, Dissent, which alongside von Oswald featured Halo and jazz percussionist Heinrich Köbberling.

In March 2022, Halo composed the score to Cecilie Bahnsen's Fall/Winter 2022 runway show at Paris Fashion Week, which featured a poem by Tove Ditlevsen recited by artist Puce Mary. In April 2022, Halo premiered a new multichannel work for piano and electronics, entitled Octavia, commissioned by Ina-GRM and presented at the Maison de la Radio in Paris. In October 2022 Smalltown Supersound released Norwegian free jazz pianist Anja Lauvdal's debut solo album, From A Story Now Lost, which featured Halo as main producer.

As of January 2023 Halo joined the Composition and Experimental Sound Practices faculty of The Herb Alpert School of Music at CalArts.

Discography

Studio albums

Soundtrack releases

Extended plays

Singles

Remixes

Guest appearances

Collaborations
FRKWYS Vol. 7 LP  (RVNG Intl., 2011)
Terepa EP  (Other People, 2015)
Dissent LP (as Moritz von Oswald Trio) (Modern Recordings, 2021)

As producer 

 Anja Lauvdal - From A Story Now Lost LP (Smalltown Supersound, 2022)

References

External links 
Official website
Laurel Halo discography at Discogs

American electronic musicians
Musicians from Ann Arbor, Michigan
Living people
Place of birth missing (living people)
Hyperdub artists
American women in electronic music
1985 births
21st-century American musicians
American expatriates in Germany
Musicians from Berlin
21st-century American women